Anna-Carina Kristler (born 17 July 1988) is a retired Austrian footballer who played as a goalkeeper for Sturm Graz in the ÖFB-Frauenliga.

References

External links

1988 births
Living people
Austria women's international footballers
Austrian women's footballers
Women's association football goalkeepers
SK Sturm Graz (women) players
ÖFB-Frauenliga players